The 27th Bachsas Awards were given by Bangladesh Cholochitra Sangbadik Samity (Bangladesh Cine-Journalists' Association) to outstanding performers of the silver screen, small screen, music, dance and theatre in 2005. This award was introduced in 1972 to encourage the fledgling film industry of the country.

List of Winners

Lifetime Achievement Awards
 Film - Amjad Hossain
 Music - Runa Laila

Film

Drama Serial

Television Program
 Best Talk Show (Educational) - Tritiyo Matra

References 

Bachsas Awards
Awards established in 1972